is a town located in the Kamiminochi District of norther Nagano Prefecture, Japan.

Geography
Iizuna is located in northern Nagano Prefecture. It is 13.9 km from east to west and 15.6 km in the south north. The Yaja River that flows from the Mount Reisenji forms the western border of the town which is located on its river terrace. The Torii River flows through the center of town. The Madarao River flows from Shinano, and flows on the north side of this town. It joins the Chikuma River via the Nakano city in the east.

Climate
The village has a climate characterized by hot and humid summers, and cold winters (Köppen climate classification Cfa).  The average annual temperature in Iizuna is 11.3 °C. The average annual rainfall is 1254 mm with September as the wettest month. The temperatures are highest on average in August, at around 24.9 °C, and lowest in January, at around -1.5 °C.

Surrounding municipalities
Nagano Prefecture
 Nagano
 Nakano
 Shinano

Demographics 
Per Japanese census data, the population of Iizuna was relatively stable throughout the late 20th century but has declined in recent decades.

History
The area of present-day Iizuna was part of ancient Shinano Province. During the Edo period, Mure developed as a post station on the Hokkoku Kaidō highway.

The modern town was created through a merger of the villages of Samizu and Mure on October 1, 2005. Its name comes from Mount Iizuna which dominates the town's western sky.

Economy
The economy of Iizuna is agricultural, primarily rice cultivation and horticulture.

Education
Iizuna has four public elementary schools and one public middle school operated by the town government, and one high school operated the Nagano Prefectural Board of Education.

High school
 Nagano Prefectural Hokubu High School.

Junior high school
 Iizuna Junior High School

Elementary schools
 Iizuna Choritsu Murehigashi Elementary School
 Iizuna Choritsu Murehinishi Elementary School
 Iizuna Choritsu Samizudaiichi Elementary School
 Iizuna Choritsu Samizudaini Elementary School

Transportation

Railway
  Shinano Railway - Kita-Shinano Line

Highway
 Jōshin-etsu Expressway

Local attractions
 Iizuna is notable for being home to The Spiral, Asia's only permanent bobsleigh, luge and skeleton track. This track was a venue for the 1998 Winter Olympic Games.

References

External links

Official Website 

 
Towns in Nagano Prefecture